Greenway Halt was a request stop on the former Ledbury and Gloucester Railway. It opened on 1st April 1937  and closed in 1959 when the line was closed to passengers. It was situated along the profile of what is now the Dymock Road, 4 miles from Ledbury.  The Victorian station house remains today on the site opposite the Old Nail Shop.  It continues to run in parallel to the River Leadon another mile before it reaches the village and Dymock station.

References

Further reading

Disused railway stations in Gloucestershire
Former Great Western Railway stations
Railway stations in Great Britain opened in 1937
Railway stations in Great Britain closed in 1959